Julien's Auctions is a privately held auction house based in Culver City, California founded in 2003 by Darren Julien and co-owned with Martin Nolan. They specialize in  auctions of film memorabilia, music memorabilia, sports memorabilia, and street and contemporary art. Julien's Auctions has received attention for their auctions of various high-profile items. They have handled collections and estates from entertainers such as Marilyn Monroe, John Lennon, Ringo Starr, Banksy, Cher, Michael Jackson, Sharon Tate, and Burt Reynolds. The auction house's first placement was in 2009 for the sale of one of Michael Jackson's bejeweled white gloves which sold for $420,000.

Notable auctions and sales records
In 2009, Michael Jackson's signature white glove sold for $420,000 and his white socks sold for $65,000; in 2011 the jacket he wore in his 1983 "Thriller" music video sold for $1,800,000.

In October 2010, the 'Most Expensive Basketball' is sold from a Michael Jackson and Michael Jordan video for $304,000.
In December 2011, a 1915 prototype for Coca-Cola's iconic bottle sold for $240,000 with its original concept drawing selling for $228,000.
In November 2015, a Gibson J-160E guitar that was stolen from John Lennon in the late 1960's sold for $2,410,000. The same auction also sold Ringo Starr’s 1964 drumhead from “The Ed Sullivan Show” for $2,050,000.
In December 2015, Ringo Starr's drum kit achieved a World Record for 'Most Expensive Drum Kit' when it sold for $2,110,000; in that same auction, Starr's personal copy of The Beatles “White Album” sold for $790,000.
In June 2016, world association football icon Pelé auctioned off his personal career-related memorabilia totaling over $5,000,000.
In November 2016, Marilyn Monroe's “Happy Birthday, Mr. President” dress sold for $4,800,000. As of 2022, it remains the most expensive gown ever bought at an auction.
In December 2017, Neil Young’s 1953 Buick Roadmaster sold for $400,000.
In June 2020, the guitar used by Kurt Cobain on Nirvana's MTV Unplugged in New York sold for US$6 Million.

References

External links

American auction houses
American companies established in 2003
Retail companies established in 2003